Saints Row is a series of action-adventure video games created by Volition and published by THQ and Deep Silver. The series follows the 3rd Street Saints, a fictional street gang originally operating out of the Saints Row district, hence the series' title.

Gameplay in the Saints Row games focuses on an open world where the player can complete missions to progress an overall story, as well as engage in various side activities. Most of the gameplay revolves around driving and shooting, with occasional role-playing elements. Due to early entries being labeled as Grand Theft Auto clones, the developers sought to create a more distinctive experience from the third game onwards, with a heavy focus on over-the-top gameplay, popular culture homages, parodies, and self-referential humor; these changes have been controversial among fans of the original games. The first four games in the Saints Row series were set primarily in two fictional locales—Stilwater and Steelport—which are loosely based on real American cities. The games center on an initially unnamed player-created character (later nicknamed "the Boss") who joins the 3rd Street Saints by chance and helps them defeat enemy gangs in city-wide turf wars. Later down the line, they become the gang's leader, a celebrity and pop culture icon, and eventually President of the United States, while facing more powerful enemies, such as an anti-gang paramilitary and an alien empire.

Work on the original Saints Row began in 2003, after Volition's completion of Red Faction II. The game was released in August 2006 to critical acclaim and commercial success. The sequel, Saints Row 2, was released in October 2008 to similar acclaim and greater commercial success. The series' third entry, Saints Row: The Third, was released in November 2011 and was the final Saints Row video game to be published by THQ before Deep Silver acquired the rights to series in 2013. The series' fourth entry, Saints Row IV was released in August 2013, with a standalone expansion called Gat out of Hell released in January 2015 in North America and Europe. As of September 2013, the series has had sales in excess of 13 million, making it one of the best-selling video game franchises of all-time.

A reboot of the franchise, titled Saints Row, was announced in August 2021, and released in August 2022. The reboot takes place in the fictional city of Santo Ileso in the American southwest, and follows a new gang, simply called The Saints, as they attempt to take control of the city from the different gangs ruling it.

Games

Saints Row (2006)

Saints Row is the first installment in the series, having begun development in mid-2003 as a PlayStation 2 title under the name Bling Bling. The game was announced at E3 2005 for the Xbox 360. It was supposed to also have a port to the Nintendo Wii. As the first non-linear gameplay-style video game to be released for the Xbox 360, Saints Row was widely anticipated; its pre-beta demo build set records after being downloaded nearly 400,000 times within a week. It had sales in excess of 500,000 during its September 2006 release month, and was critically acclaimed. As of 2019, the game has had sales in excess of two million units. The game was renowned for being the first seventh-generation sandbox game, and introduced features which have since become staples to the genre. It features online multiplayer, an in-game mobile phone, GPS navigation, elaborate character, vehicle customization, and a weapon wheel.

The game is set in the fictional city of Stilwater. Players create their own character, who remains silent for most of the game and is referred to as "Playa". After being caught in a shootout between three warring gangs—the Vice Kings, Los Carnales, the Westside Rollerz—the player character is rescued by a fourth, smaller gang called the 3rd Street Saints, and subsequently joins the Saints to help them take back the Saint's Row district from their rivals. From there, the player's goal is to take over the entire city in the name of the Saints by weakening the gangs that control each district. They do so by completing both main and side missions related to each enemy faction, which can be carried out solo or with the help of fellow gang members.

Saints Row 2 (2008)

Saints Row 2 began development in mid-2006, a few months before the Xbox 360 release of Saints Row. While a PlayStation 3 port of Saints Row was in development, it was cancelled when Saints Row 2 was confirmed in May 2007. A Microsoft Windows port, announced in June 2008, was released in early 2009. The game builds upon the fundamentals of Saints Row by improving the respect system, adding more varied activities, increasing the extent to which the player can customize their character, gang, and vehicles, and adding a number of new vehicle models. It expands the Stilwater setting with locations, and adds gameplay features and content.

The story is set roughly five years after the events of Saints Row, and follows the same player character (now identified as "the Boss"), who awakens from a coma to discover that the 3rd Street Saints have fallen from grace in their absence, allowing three new gangs—the Ronin, the Brotherhood, and the Sons of Samedi—to take over the Saints' former territories. Furthermore, the Saint's Row district has been a pristine commercial and residential area by the Ultor Corporation, who have further plans for Stilwater. After recruiting new and old allies to their cause and setting up a new base of operations, the Boss works restore the Saints to power, this time as the gang's leader. The story is structured similarly to the first game, with players undertaking missions related to each gang that they must defeat, as well as Ultor later in the storyline. These missions are mostly independent from each other, and require the player to gain respect by completing side activities first.

Downloadable content
Saints Row 2 received several downloadable content (DLC) releases, including two story DLCs. The first, Ultor Exposed, adds Red Faction: Guerrilla-themed content, and stars American pornographic actress Tera Patrick, who plays herself as a whistleblower and former microbiologist for the Ultor Corporation. It was released on 23 April 2009. The second, Corporate Warfare, focuses on the struggle between the Saints and the Ultor Corporation, and was released on 28 May 2009.

Saints Row: The Third (2011)

Saints Row: The Third was announced in March 2011, and released for the Xbox 360, PlayStation 3, and Microsoft Windows in November 2011. It began early development at Volition in September 2008, a month before Saints Row 2 was due to release. The game marks a major turning point for the series, putting more emphasis on comedy and featuring numerous popular culture homages, parodies, and self-referential humor, as well as an over-the-top nature. Reception towards these changes was mixed, though the game nonetheless performed well both critically and financially.

The game features a new setting: Stilwater's sister city, Steelport, which is controlled by a single criminal organization known as the Syndicate, consisting of three gangs: the Morningstar, the Luchadores, and the Deckers. The 3rd Street Saints, now celebrities with a large cult following after selling their license to Ultor to produce merchandise based on the gang, find themselves stranded in Steelport after an altercation with the Syndicate, and must find new allies to help them take over the city and eliminate their rivals. Halfway through the game, Steelport is placed under martial law in response to the increasing gang violence, and a paramilitary known as S.T.A.G. is called to restore order to the city, complicating matters further for the Saints. The mission structure has been changed from the first two games, requiring missions to be played in a certain order. The game incorporates choices into its narrative, and features multiple possible endings.

Downloadable content
Downloadable content for Saints Row: The Third was announced before the game's release along with a commitment from publisher THQ to support 40 weeks of content. Among smaller upgrades, three main content packs were released: Genkibowl VII (released on 17 January 2012), which adds challenges as part of the titular contest; Gangstas in Space (released on 21 February 2012), focusing on a film the Saints are producing which involves aliens; and The Trouble with Clones (released on 20 March 2012), focusing on the Saints reuniting with a hulking clone of their deceased friend, Johnny Gat.

Remaster
A remastered version of Saints Row: The Third, including all the DLC for the original game, was released for Windows, PlayStation 4, and Xbox One on May 22, 2020. It was developed by Sperasoft and features remastered assets and textures, along with improved graphics and lighting.

Saints Row IV (2013)

Saints Row IV was unveiled in March 2013 and released August 2013, for Microsoft Windows, PlayStation 3, and Xbox 360. It was later ported to PlayStation 4, Xbox One, and Linux in 2015. A Nintendo Switch port was also released on March 27, 2020. The game expands on Saint Row: The Thirds humor and over-the-top nature, introducing superpowers. Saints Row IV received several limited and summative edition releases, and was briefly banned in Australia. It generated mostly positive reviews and sold over one million copies in its first week.

The game is set five years after the events of Saints Row: The Third, and begins with the Boss being elected President of the United States after foiling a terrorist attack. When an alien empire known as the Zin attacks the Earth, the Boss and the other Saints are abducted and placed in a simulation of Steelport meant to break their wills. The Boss is able to manipulate the simulation to their own benefit, gaining superpowers, and must find a way to escape, rescue their friends, and defeat the Zin, while facing enemies from their past and their own worst fears.

Downloadable content
Saints Row IVs first story-driven downloadable content pack, Enter the Dominatrix, is a "director's cut" version of the cancelled Saints Row: The Third expansion of the same name, and was released on 22 October 2013. The story continues from the non-canonical ending of Saints Row: The Third, and depicts an alternate version of the Zin invasion. The second story DLC, How the Saints Save Christmas, was released on 10 December 2013. Its story revolves around the Saints' attempts to rescue Santa Claus from the Steelport simulation, with the Boss, who dislikes the holiday season, learning the true meaning of Christmas along the way.

A standalone expansion to Saints Row IV, Gat out of Hell, was released on 20 January 2015 in North America and 23 January 2015 in Europe. The game focuses on Saints members Johnny Gat and Kinzie Kensington and their efforts to rescue the Boss from Hell after they are kidnapped by Satan.

Saints Row (2022) 

Embracer Group's financial report released in August 2019 stated that a new Saints Row title is in development at Volition studios. In August 2021, the new game was confirmed to be a reboot to the franchise. The reboot, titled Saints Row, was released for the PlayStation 4, PlayStation 5, Xbox One, Xbox Series X/S, Windows, and Stadia on 23 August 2022. The game is intended to be a return to the franchise's roots, with a focus on gang warfare and a less "wacky" tone than Saints Row IV.

Gameplay
The Saints Row games are set in an open world. The series combines elements of action, adventure and vehicular gameplay. The player can freely roam the virtual world on foot or by use of vehicles and make use of an array of weapon and mêlée based combat. Illegal activity such as assaulting non-player character civilians and police officers will instigate a proactive and potentially lethal response from authoritative figures. In the instance of death or arrest, the player will respawn at a nearby hospital or police station.

An emphasis is put on urban warfare; the player character is affiliated with a street gang known as the 3rd Street Saints. Game missions are structurally divided into separate mission arcs. These mission arcs do not intertwine but can be played through altogether at once or separately by the player. Missions are unlocked by accruing respect points; respect is game currency earned by playing non-story mini-games known as activities and diversions. Customization constitutes a large portion of gameplay. The player has the ability to customize their character's appearance and clothing, can take certain vehicles to chop shops for modification and in Saints Row 2 is able to decorate the interior of in-game safe-houses and refine the behaviour of the Third Street Saints gang.

Setting

Stilwater
The setting of both Saints Row and Saints Row 2 is the fictional city of Stilwater, located in the midwestern state of Michigan, United States. Stilwater is primarily based on the real-world American city Detroit. During the early development process of Saints Row, the city was designed before the script was assembled and was more than four times the size of its final version. It was cropped to a smaller size because development resources could not support a city that large. Stilwater's red light district is largely based on Harlem, including the Raykins Hotel as The Cotton Club. During its development phase, the city went through constant expansion and cropping. For example, the shopping mall and trailer park districts in Saints Row 2 were originally included in early designs of Saints Row. One design challenge was creating the city without load-screen interference, so the engine was designed to stream around the player's location in individual chunks of the city. The city was designed to feel diverse and have a variance of districts; Saints Row product art director Matt Flegel commented that "We wanted the city to cover all styles, from the towering sky scrapers of downtown to the gritty industrial feel of the factory district. We want the player to feel the changes between the districts, rather than just noticing the visual difference." The districts were designed to feel relevant to the gangs that controlled them.

The Stilwater of Saints Row 2 is significantly different from its original rendition; the city is 45% bigger than its older counterpart. Much of the city from Saints Row is redeveloped in Saints Row 2, albeit becoming more "alive" and full of depth. Saints Row 2 lead producer Greg Donovan said that "Stilwater in Saints Row 2 is very different from Saints Row. In fact, every detail has been touched to some degree or another. [...] I think that what will end up happening is that people who played Saints Row or are fans of the franchise are going to have a great time exploring the city and looking for new things. [Also], people that are new to Saints Row 2 are just going to be presented with a huge, very dispersive and very different looking environment, it's very well polished and detailed." There are no in-game load screens in Saints Row 2, a notable feat as the game allows for seamless co-operative play. There are over 130 interiors within the city, including over ninety different shops. The city is more dynamic and lifelike in Saints Row 2, as the artificial intelligence is smarter, i.e., civilians will interact with each other. Additionally, certain elements of Saints Row 2s environment are destructible as the game shares some technology with the Volition-developed Red Faction: Guerrilla game. Its environment also features numerous landmarks and Easter eggs; one such feature won "Top Easter Egg of 2008".

Steelport
After being driven out of Stilwater at the start of Saints Row: The Third by The Syndicate, the Saints aim to get revenge by taking over their home city, Steelport, which is loosely based on New York City. Steelport was arguably less impressive than Stilwater, with districts being almost identical (all areas have a run-down look) and there being few distinct areas. The most memorable feature of the city is a large statue of folk hero Joe Magarac, inspired by the real-life Statue of Liberty. However, a new feature is that different choices during the game will cause minor changes in the game's world.

In Saints Row IV, the game is again set in Steelport, however as a Matrix-like simulation created by the game's alien villain, Zinyak. To fit his likeness, Zinyak has removed almost all signs of the Saints from the city (for example, the Saints' own chain of clothing stores, Planet Saints, have been replaced with Planet Zin) and added images of himself and alien technology. Throughout the game, the player disrupts and eventually destroys the simulation in order to find and kill Zinyak. The fact this version of Steelport is set in a simulation allows for new gameplay mechanics like superpowers. It allows for references to past games: in some missions, characters from past games and gangs can appear in the city. An entertaining example is when the player has to kill the default character from the original Saints Row. The player is able to explore different simulations, such as when the player has to rescue the other main characters from their individual 'nightmare' simulations, based on the worst times in their lives to break them and make them surrender to the Zin. The only time the game takes place in the real world is at the start and end of the game and when the player is in the Zin facility or in The Ship, a stolen Zin spaceship which acts as the base for the Saints other than the player's simulation.

New Hades 
Saints Row: Gat Out Of Hell takes place in New Hades, the capital city of Hell. It is much smaller than any of the cities in past games and, as a result of its harsh location, is very basic in its design. The city is optimised for the game's new flying mechanic and its activity-based story. Instead of water, the city's islands are surrounded by lava, and in the centre, there is a massive tower that has a large hole above it, presumably the entry point to Hell.

Other media

Film
In 2009, rapper 50 Cent announced that he was working on writing a screenplay and optioning the rights for a Saints Row film.

A Saints Row film was announced to be in pre-production in April 2019, with production by Fenix Studios, Koch Media and Occupant Entertainment. F. Gary Gray is set to direct the film with a screenplay written by Greg Russo. Russo has stated that the film will be influenced by both The Warriors and Escape from New York.

Cancelled games
A spin-off titled Saints Row: Undercover was being developed by Savage Entertainment for the PSP in 2009 but was cancelled. On 22 January 2016, Volition found a prototype of the game in a PSP development kit and released it as a free download on Unseen64.net.

Saints Row: Money Shot was to be a spin-off of the main series, originally developed for Xbox Live Arcade. The game would be available for the Xbox 360 as an Xbox Live Arcade game and for the PlayStation 3 as a PlayStation Network game featuring 3D graphics. The game would have been tied to Saints Row: The Third, as part of the marketing campaign for the game. Playing Saints Row: Money Shot would have unlocked exclusive content for use in Saints Row: The Third, and vice versa.

Other cancelled games include a Nintendo 3DS title announced at E3 2010 called Saints Row: Drive By, and a Kinect/PlayStation Move fighting game for Xbox 360 and PlayStation 3 called Saints Row: The Cooler.

Saints Row shared universe
The events of Saints Row take place in a shared universe alongside Agents of Mayhem.

Agents of Mayhem

Agents of Mayhem, a new intellectual property set in the Saints Row universe, was announced in June 2016. The game is set in a futuristic Seoul, South Korea, and takes place after the events of Gat Out of Hells "Recreate Earth" ending, wherein the Saints Row continuity was retconned. The cinematic announcement trailer showed Persephone Brimstone (a character featured in the closing epilogue of Gat Out of Hell) leading an organization known as "M.A.Y.H.E.M." under the Ultor Corporation's payroll and to stop the terrorist organisation "L.E.G.I.O.N." from destroying the world's nations. Agents of Mayhem was released on 15 August 2017. Pierce Washington and Oleg Kirlov are two of the game's twelve playable characters, while Johnny Gat and Kinzie Kensington were added via downloadable content.

Reception

Critical reception

Both Saints Row and Saints Row 2 received positive reviews for their Xbox 360 and PlayStation 3 ports. However, the mobile phone ports of both games as well as the Windows port of Saints Row 2 received a more mixed response. Additionally, the downloadable content packs for Saints Row 2 received mostly average reviews.

The Xbox 360 port of Saints Row received generally positive reviews and scores. It received an 82.20% and 81/100 from review aggregators GameRankings and Metacritic respectively. IGN reviewer Douglass Perry awarded the game an 8.5/10, praising the presentation and gameplay while pointing out technical shortcomings as well as the often forced humour. GameSpot reviewer Greg Kasavin awarded the game an 8.3/10, giving credit to the driving, the action, the presentation and the story. However, he criticized the lack of polish and lack of variety in mission design. It was hailed as "the best reason to own a 360 this side of [The Elder Scrolls IV: Oblivion]" and a "must buy" by GamePro reviewer Vicious Sid, who awarded it five stars out of five.

Both the PlayStation 3 and Xbox 360 ports of Saints Row 2 received positive reviews. It received an 83.37% and 82.99% from GameRankings respectively, and 82/100 and 81/100 from Metacritic respectively. GameSpy reviewer Gerald Villoria awarded the game four and a half stars out of five and said that "Saints Row 2 offers up a shooting and driving experience that is plenty of fun [...] It's self-consciously funny in its irreverence, and its low-brow humor will definitely appeal to much of its audience". IGN reviewer Nate Ahearn awarded Saints Row 2 an 8.2/10, praising the gameplay but criticizing the lack of polish and the weak artificial intelligence. However, the PC port of Saints Row 2 received a much less positive response. It received an aggregated score of 70.68% and 72/100 from GameRankings and Metacritic.

Dan Whitehead of Eurogamer wrote that Grand Theft Auto IV was a boon for the Saints Row series since it allowed the latter to be "gleeful silly sandbox games" as the former series took a more serious turn.

Sales
Saints Row 2 shipped over two million units for the Xbox 360 and PlayStation 3 during October 2008, the month of its release.

On 2 November 2011, THQ CEO Brian Farrell announced that Saints Row: The Third was already the most pre-ordered title in series history. The game had four times the number of pre-orders; Saints Row 2 had two weeks before its launch. THQ estimated the game would ship over 3 million units before the publisher's fiscal year ends in March 2012. By comparison, Saints Row 2 launched in October 2008 and sold 2.6 million by the end of the fiscal year. On 25 January 2012, THQ announced that The Third had shipped 3.8 million units globally and are expecting to ship between five and six million units lifetime on the title.

To date, the series has roughly sold over 13 million units, including over three million for Saints Row 2.

Other appearances 
Johnny Gat appears as a guest character in the parody fighting game Divekick. Pierce Washington is a featured character in the PlayStation VR game 100ft Robot Golf.

Notes

References

External links 

 

 
Action-adventure games
Open-world video games
Embracer Group franchises
Video game franchises
Video game franchises introduced in 2006